Gultepe may refer to:

 Gültəpə, Azerbaijan
 Gültepe, Bismil
 Gültepe, Istanbul, a municipality in Istanbul, Turkey.
 Gültepe, Sur
 Rozsadomb, in Budapest, Hungary.